Thomson-CSF was a French company that specialized in the development and manufacture of electronics with a heavy focus upon the aerospace and defence sectors of the market.

Thomson-CSF was formed in 1968 following the merger of  Thomson-Houston-Hotchkiss-Brandt with the Compagnie Générale de Télégraphie Sans Fil (General Wireless Telegraphy Company, commonly abbreviated as CSF), these two companies being the source of the name Thomson-CSF. It operated as an electronics specialist on products such as broadcasting equipment, electroacoustics, shortwave radio sets, radar systems and television. During the 1970s, the company diversified manufacturing backend telephony equipment, semiconductors, and medical imaging apparatus. It also entered into large deals outside of the domestic market, acquiring considerable business in the Middle East.

During the late 1980s, Thomson-CSF, anticipating defence spending cutbacks, conducted a radical business restructuring, merging its semiconductor interests with those of the Italian defence group Finmeccanica and exchanging its medical imaging technology for General Electric's consumer electronics businesses. Towards the latter decades of its operations, Thomson-CSF built itself up into a multinational company. During 1989, Thomson-CSF acquired Philips' defence electronics business, Hollandse Signaalapparaten B.V. In 1999, the company was privatised, but not before disposing of its consumer electronics businesses. Shortly after, Thomson-CSF took over the British defence electronics company Racal Electronics. 

In December 2000, Thomson-CSF was rebranded Thales Group.

History
Thomson-CSF traces its origins to the formation of the American business Thomson-Houston Electric Company by Elihu Thomson and Edwin Houston in 1879. On 15 April 1892, the Thomson-Houston Electric Company merged with its rival, the Edison General Electric Company, to form General Electric (GE). That same year, the company formed an overseas subsidiary, named Thomson Houston International, based in France. During 1893, Compagnie Française Thomson-Houston (CFTH) was established as a partner to GE. CFTH's operations centered around the application of GE's patents in the growing electricity generation and transmission industry. The modern Thomson companies evolved from this company.

During 1966, CFTH merged with armaments and vehicle manufacturer Hotchkiss-Brandt to form Thomson-Houston-Hotchkiss-Brandt, which was subsequently renamed Thomson-Brandt. Two years later, the electronics business of Thomson-Brandt merged with Compagnie Générale de Télégraphie Sans Fil (General Wireless Telegraphy Company, commonly abbreviated as CSF) to form Thomson-CSF. Prior to the merger, CSF had operated as a pioneer in the fields of broadcasting, electroacoustics, shortwave radio, radar systems and television. Thomson Brandt maintained a significant shareholding in the merged company (approximately 40%).

During the 1970s, Thomson-CSF received its first major contract in the Middle Eastern market. In this period the company diversified into several new sectors, leading to it manufacturing backend telephony equipment, semiconductors and medical imaging apparatus. By the early 1980s Thomson-CSF was in a weak financial position with a high level of debt. While it possessed a diversified portfolio of businesses, its market share within the majority of these many sectors was viewed as being too small to be realistically profitable despite increasing business from overseas buyers.

During 1982, both Thomson-Brandt and Thomson-CSF were nationalised by France's Mitterrand government. As a consequence, Thomson-Brandt was renamed Thomson SA (Société Anonyme) and merged with Thomson-CSF. Throughout the 1980s, the company's financial position improved dramatically as undertook a major reorganisation, focusing its efforts on the production of electronics for professional and defence customers.

In 1983, it divested Thomson-CSF Téléphone , its civil telecommunications division, to telecommunications specialist Alcatel. Four years later, its semiconductor interests were merged with those of the Italian defence group Finmeccanica. That same year, Thomson-CSF's medical imaging technology was exchanged with GE for GE's RCA and consumer electronics businesses.

During the late 1980s, Thomson-CSF, anticipating future defence spending cutbacks and a downturn in its lucrative export contracts, initiated a restructuring of its businesses with the aim of maintaining its margins. A policy of proactive external growth was adopted, focusing on the European market. Between 1976 and 1987, the company's non-French subsidiaries' share of consolidated revenues rose from 5% to 25%. During 1988, a new division, Thomson Consumer Electronics was formed. In 1995, this division was rebranded as Thomson Multimedia. During 1989, it acquired Philips' defence electronics business, Hollandse Signaalapparaten B.V. During the 1990s, Thomson-CSF gained a controlling interest in Sextant Avionique, which was formed by the merger of the company's avionics business with that of French aircraft manufacturer Aérospatiale. The company also divested its interests in the French bank Crédit Lyonnais and semiconductor manufacturer SGSThomson.

During the late 1990s, French Prime Minister Lionel Jospin's Plural Left government initiated a policy of privatisation of several state-owned companies, including Thomson-CSF. During April 1998, several of the affected companies, including Aérospatiale, Alcatel, Dassault Industries, Thomson-CSF and Thomson SA reached a cooperation agreement endorsed by the French government. Several of these terms brought about a major restructuring of Thomson-CSF. Firstly, the professional and defence electronics businesses of Alcatel and Dassault Électronique were merged with Thomson-CSF. Secondly, satellite businesses of Alcatel, Aerospatiale and Thomson-CSF are merged to form a new entity, Alcatel Space; this was jointly owned by Alcatel and Thomson-CSF.

By June 1998, implementation of the finalised agreement had commenced. The majority of Thomson-CSF's capital was transferred into private ownership. The French State reduced its holding in the company from 58% to 40%. At the time, Thomson-CSF's principal private shareholders were Alcatel and Dassault Industries. The division of the company's consumer electronics and defence businesses prior to privatisation brought about the creation of Thomson Multimedia, which was a distinct entity from Thomson-CSF. The independently-operating Thomson Multimedia has since been restructured and trades as Technicolor SA.

Following its privatisation, Thomson-CSF continued to orient itself towards the defence electronics sector, establishing itself in overseas nations, including South Africa, Australia, South Korea and Singapore. Shortly after its privatisation, the company began exploring the possibility of merging with British defence specialist Marconi Electronic Systems. Its ambitions were foiled by the success of a rival bid by the defence and aerospace firm British Aerospace, which rebranded itself as BAE Systems shortly thereafter. Keen to expand its defence and technology business, Thomson-CSF announced the acquisition of the British defence electronics company Racal Electronics, which it purchased for £1.3 billion. As a result of its takeover of Racal, the UK became Thomson-CSF's second-largest domestic industrial base after France. Racal was initially rebranded Thomson-CSF Racal plc.

Shortly after the Racal acquisition, Thomson-CSF conducted a strategic review of its portfolio of businesses. It adopted a new organisational structure comprising three business areas: defence, aerospace, and information technology and services. Management decided that the company ought to leverage its dual-purpose technology, marketing itself towards particular civil markets that held strong parallels with its established defence and aerospace competencies, such as mobile telecommunications. Meanwhile, non-strategic assets were divested. Thomson-CSF also explored business opportunities further afield. In December 2000, it was announced that the company was forming a joint venture with the American defence company Raytheon. This arrangement was claimed to be first transatlantic joint venture in the defence sector.

During December 2000, Thomson-CSF was officially rebranded as Thales (from the Greek philosopher Thales, pronounced  reflecting its pronunciation in French).

References

Citations

Further reading 
 
 L'entreprise partagée ? Une pratique différente des relations sociales : l'expérience Thomson-CSF, Robert Thomas (pseudonym for a team-work with Pierre Beretti and Jean-Pierre Thiollet), Paris, Maxima-Laurent du Mesnil Ed., 1999

Avionics companies
Defunct manufacturing companies of France
Technicolor SA
Thales Group